Coreopsis grandiflora is a North American species of perennial plant in the family Asteraceae.  The common name is large-flowered tickseed. It is found in eastern Canada (Quebec, Ontario, New Brunswick) and much of the United States, especially the south-central part of the country (Oklahoma, Arkansas, etc.). The species is widely cultivated in China and naturalized there.

Coreopsis grandiflora is a perennial herb sometimes greater than 60 cm (2 feet) tall. It produces yellow ray and disc flowers. Its native habitats include prairies, glades, open woods, thickets, roadsides and open ground. The Latin specific epithet grandiflora means large-flowered. The plant attracts bees and butterflies.

In the UK the cultivar 'Early Sunrise' has received the Royal Horticultural Society's Award of Garden Merit.

References

grandiflora
Flora of North America
Plants described in 1826